American rock band In This Moment has released seven studio albums, one live album, one compilation album, 20 singles and 18 music videos.

Albums

Studio albums

Live albums

Compilation albums

Extended plays

Singles

Music videos

Notes

References

Discographies of American artists
Heavy metal group discographies